Harry Francis Hanson (January 17, 1896 – October 6, 1966) was a Major League Baseball catcher. In 1 career game, he had no hits in 2 at-bats. He batted and threw right-handed.

Hanson was born in Elgin, Illinois and died in Savannah, Georgia.

External links
Baseball Reference.com page

1896 births
1966 deaths
New York Yankees players
Major League Baseball catchers
Baseball players from Illinois
Sportspeople from the Chicago metropolitan area
Sportspeople from Elgin, Illinois